Mohammad Kazim Bin Elias (born November 28, 1972), better known as Ustaz Kazim Elias, is a Malaysian popular independent preacher, writer, lecturer and Islamic consultant from Malaysia.

Honours

Honours of Malaysia
  :
  Knight Commander of the Order of the Territorial Crown (PMW) – Datuk (2015)
  :
  Knight Commander of the Order of the Perak State Crown (DPMP) – Dato' (2015)

References

1972 births
Living people
Malaysian people of Malay descent
Sunni Muslim scholars of Islam
Malaysian Muslims
21st-century imams
Malaysian motivational speakers
People from Perak